Ma Ma Htake and Heritage House is a 2016 Burmese comedy-drama television series. It aired on MRTV-4, from November 17 to December 30, 2016, on Mondays to Fridays at 19:15 for 30 episodes.

Synopsis
It is about of an over thirty years old virgin woman who taking care of her one nephew and four nieces in the heritage house.

Cast

Main cast
Khine Thin Kyi as Ma Ma Htake, Htake Htar
Hein Htet as Phoe Htoo, Htoo Nay Lin
Mone as Mi Aye, Htake Khin Khin Aye
Hsu Waddy as Mi Jue, Jue Kalayar Htake
Poe Kyar Phyu Khin as Mi Mhway, Htake Khin Khin Mhway
May Akari Htoo as Mi Zu, Zu Kalyar Htake

Supporting
Thet Oo Ko as U Wai, Wai Yan Lin
Min Thar Ki as Ko Phyo, Wai Phyo Aung
Shin Mway La as Zeyar Maung
Thar Htet Nyan Zaw as Nyi Nyi
Zu Zu Zan as Malar Tint
Ko Ko Lin Maung as U Htun, U Tin Htun Lwin
Sai Si Tom Kham as Chit Thu Maung

References

External links

Burmese television series
MRTV (TV network) original programming